Flight 253 may refer to:

 Linea Aeropostal Venezolana Flight 253 (June 1956), an airliner that crashed in the Atlantic Ocean off New Jersey on 20 June 1956
 Linea Aeropostal Venezolana Flight 253 (November 1956), an airliner that crashed in Venezuela on 27 November 1956
 Seaboard World Airlines Flight 253A, Soviet-American airspace incident of 1 July 1968
 El Al Flight 253, attacked by terrorists while departing from a layover in Athens, Greece on 26 December 1968
 Northwest Airlines Flight 253, attempted terrorist bombing incident of 25 December 2009

0253